Chaparral Prairie State Nature Preserve is a  nature preserve located in Adams County, Ohio, United States, near the city of West Union.  The prairie is a remnant of what was once a larger ecosystem. These grassland openings were probably created by the extinct megafauna, such as mammoths and mastodons, that were once found in the area. Native American fires may have also played a role in maintaining this landscape. In modern times the prairie species found refuge on the dry, rocky openings in this part of the state. Today, controlled burns are used at Chaparral Prairie to keep woody species at bay.

Chaparral Prairie supports the most extensive population of rattlesnake-master in the state. Prairie dock and spiked blazing star are also unusually abundant at this site, as well as eleven state-endangered species, including Blue False Indigo. Post oak, blackjack oak, and eastern redcedar are the most common trees surviving in the prairie, and little bluestem is the dominant prairie grass. The rare Edward's hairstreak butterfly has also been observed.

The preserve is open to the public, and contains a  trail with bulletin board, interpretive signs and a parking lot.

External links 
 Chaparral Prairie State Nature Preserve at ODNR Division of Natural Areas and Preserves
 Chaparral Prairie State Nature Preserve at American Byways

Protected areas of Adams County, Ohio
Ohio State Nature Preserves